For people with the surname, see Seminara (surname).

Seminara borders the following municipalities: Bagnara Calabra, Gioia Tauro, Melicuccà, Oppido Mamertina, Palmi, Rizziconi, San Procopio.

The Battle of Seminara in the First Italian War occurred near the town in 1495. Seminara was also the birthplace of Barlaam of Seminara and Leontius Pilatus, who were two of the most important Byzantine scholars of the Renaissance period.

Notable people
 Barlaam of Seminara (14th century Greek scholar, humanist, philologist and theologian)
 Leontius Pilatus (14th century Greek scholar, philosopher and theologian)

References

Cities and towns in Calabria